Domestic Violence is a 2001 American documentary film edited, produced, and directed by Frederick Wiseman. The film premiered on September 4, 2001 at the 58th Venice International Film Festival.

References

External links
Official Zipporah Films site

2001 films
2001 documentary films
American documentary films
Films about domestic violence
Films directed by Frederick Wiseman
Films set in Tampa, Florida
2000s English-language films
2000s American films